Tarsagonum is a genus of ground beetles in the family Carabidae. There are at least four described species in Tarsagonum.

Species
These four species belong to the genus Tarsagonum:
 Tarsagonum breve Fedorenko, 2020  (Laos)
 Tarsagonum indicum Fedorenko, 2020  (India)
 Tarsagonum kaszabi Louwerens, 1966  (Borneo and Indonesia)
 Tarsagonum latipes Darlington, 1952  (New Guinea)

References

Platyninae